Gongga may refer to:

Mount Gongga, mount in Sichuan, China
Gonggar County, county in Tibet